Rabbi Nochum Partzovitz (he: נחום פרצוביץ) (died November 26, 1986) was a rabbi and Rosh Yeshiva of Yeshivas Mir and is known worldwide for erudite explanations of Talmudic topics.

Biography
Partzovitz was born in Trakai, Poland to its Chief Rabbi, Rabbi Aryeh Tzvi Partzovitz. Rabbi Aryeh Tzvi was a grandson of the posek of Vilna, Rabbi Shlomo HaKohen and son-in-law to Rabbi Nochum Greenhouse.

As a young boy, Partzovitz was reputed to have been so eager to engage in Torah study that he would run to cheder in the morning barefoot because putting on shoes took up too much time.

Rabbi Partzovitz learned from an early age in the Baranovich Yeshiva under the leadership of Rabbi Elchonon Wasserman and Rabbi Dovid Rappaport. However, when he reached the age of thirteen, the yeshiva's administration decided that his level of Talmudic study was too advanced for their school, so he was sent to learn under Rabbi Boruch Ber Leibowitz.

At the age of fifteen, Rabbi Aryeh Tzvi, an alumnus of Yeshivas Mir, convinced his son to relocate to the Mirrer Yeshiva, where he was warmly welcomed by its Rosh Yeshiva, Rabbi Eliezer Yehuda Finkel. Soon after joining the yeshiva, the Mir Yeshiva was exiled to Shanghai to escape the horrors of the Holocaust which annihilated much of European Jewry during World War II. In Shanghai, Reb Nachum continued to learn with tremendous diligence, earning the respect and admiration of the Yeshiva's Mashgiach, Rabbi Yechezkel Levenstein, and acting Rosh Yeshiva, Rabbi Chaim Leib Shmuelevitz. During this time, Reb Nochum—known as Reb Nochom Troker—is reputed to have studied daily for twelve hours straight with his colleague Rabbi Shmuel Berenbaum. He also studied in China with Rabbi Abba Berman.

After briefly immigrating to Toronto, Ontario, Canada, following World War II, Partzovitz moved to Israel and joined the newly established Mir Yeshiva of Jerusalem. There he married Ettel, the daughter of Rabbi Shmuelevitz. Partzovitz studied as a partner with Rabbi Berenbaum's brother-in-law, Rabbi Elya Svei, during the latter's brief stay in Israel.

Following the death of Rav Shmuelevitz in 1979, Partzovitz was promoted to Rosh Yeshiva of Mir, however, due to physical illness, his active reign as Rosh Yeshiva was short-lived. As a Talmudic lecturer and later Rosh Yeshiva in Mir Yeshiva, Partzovitz is known for having close personal relationships with his students.

Partzovitz was survived by his two sons, Rabbi Tzvi Partzovitz (Rosh Yeshiva of Mir Brachfeld) and Rabbi Refael Partzovitz and his three sons-in-law, Rabbi Chaim Mendel Brodsky [Rosh Yeshiva of Yeshiva Gedolah of Toronto], Rabbi Yitzchok Hellman, and Rabbi Asher Arieli.

Partzovitz's daily and general lectures are being printed posthumously by his children and students as Chiddushei Reb Nochum and Shiurei Reb Nochum. A Haggadah featuring words of Torah from the various Rosh Yeshivas of Mir also includes commentaries and lectures from Rabbi Nachum (Haggadah Shel Pesach, Mir (HE)).

Notable Students
 Chaim Mendel Brodsky - son-in-law
 Eliyahu Boruch Finkel
 Avigdor Nebenzahl
 Asher Arieli - son-in-law
 Aaron Lopiansky (Rosh Hayeshiva at Yeshiva of Greater Washington)
 Chaim Kamil
 Hanoch Teller

References
Many parts of this article were adapted from "Sunset: Stories of Our Contemporary Torah Luminaries zt"l and Their Spiritual Heroism" (Chapter "Nochum Percowiz") by Hanoch Teller.(on Google Books)

External links
Lectures by Rav Nachum in Yiddish (Kol HaLashon)
Rav Nochum Partzovitz’s Yartzheit

1986 deaths
Rosh yeshivas
Year of birth missing
Mir rosh yeshivas
Mir Yeshiva alumni